Le Boutillier, Lebouthillier or LeBoutillier are French surnames. Notable people with the surnames include:

 David Le Boutillier (1811–1854), Canadian political figure
 Diane Lebouthillier (born 1959), Canadian politician
 John Le Boutillier (1797–1872), Canadian businessman and political figure
 John LeBoutillier (born 1953), American political columnist and pundit
 Peter Leboutillier (born 1975), former Canadian ice hockey player
 Thomas LeBoutillier (1879–1929), American sports shooter
 Oliver Colin LeBoutillier (1894–1983), American pilot
 William Le Boutillier Fauvel (1850–1897), Canadian politician

See also
 Boutilier, surname
 Boutillier, surname

French-language surnames